Jack Johns (born 15 October 1997) is an Italian international rugby league footballer who plays as a  forward and  for the Newcastle Knights in the NRL.

He previously played for the South Sydney Rabbitohs in the National Rugby League.

Background
Johns was born in Newcastle, New South Wales, Australia. He is of Italian descent from his mother's side.

He played his junior rugby league for the Harbord United Devils.

Johns is the son of former Newcastle Knights player and Australian international Matthew Johns, and the nephew of rugby league Immortal Andrew Johns.

His brother Cooper Johns previously played for the Melbourne Storm.

Playing career

Early career
After finishing up with Harbord, Johns played for the Peninsula Seagulls in the Sydney Shield, where he was coached by Craig Gower.

2017
In 2017, Johns joined the Newcastle Knights, the same club his father Matthew and uncle Andrew had played over a combined 400 matches for, and won a premiership together with in 1997. He played 24 matches for their 2017 Holden Cup (Under-20s) team. In October, he was named in the Italian national squad for the 2017 World Cup.

2018
In 2018, Johns alternated between the Knights' Intrust Super Premiership NSW team and the Western Suburbs Rosellas in the Newcastle Rugby League. He parted ways with the Knights at the end of the season.

2019
In 2019, Johns joined South Sydney.  On 15 August, it was announced that Johns had signed a contract extension with Souths keeping him at the club until the end of 2020.

2020
In round 11 of the 2020 NRL season, Johns made his first grade debut for South Sydney against Canberra Raiders at GIO Stadium.

In November, Johns was released by South Sydney and subsequently signed a one-year development contract with Newcastle for the 2021 season.

2021
In round 13 of the 2021 NRL season, he made his club debut for Newcastle in a 40-4 loss against Parramatta.

References

External links

Newcastle Knights profile
South Sydney Rabbitohs profile
2017 RLWC profile

1997 births
Living people
Australian people of Italian descent
Sportspeople of Italian descent
Australian rugby league players
Italy national rugby league team players
Newcastle Knights players
Rugby league five-eighths
Rugby league players from Newcastle, New South Wales
Rugby league second-rows
South Sydney Rabbitohs players
Western Suburbs Rosellas players